Calocalanus is a genus of copepods, the only genus in the family Calocalanidae:

Calocalanus aculeatus Shmeleva, 1987
Calocalanus adriaticus Shmeleva, 1965
Calocalanus africanus Shmeleva, 1979
Calocalanus alboranus Shmeleva, 1979
Calocalanus antarcticus Shmeleva, 1978
Calocalanus atlanticus Shmeleva, 1975
Calocalanus beklemishevi Shmeleva, 1987
Calocalanus contractus Farran, 1926
Calocalanus curtus Andronov, 1973
Calocalanus dellacrocei Shmeleva, 1987
Calocalanus elegans Shmeleva, 1965
Calocalanus elongatus Shmeleva, 1968
Calocalanus equalicauda (Bernard, 1958)
Calocalanus fiolenti Shmeleva, 1978
Calocalanus fusiformis Shmeleva, 1978
Calocalanus gracilis Tanaka, 1956
Calocalanus gresei Shmeleva, 1973
Calocalanus indicus Shmeleva, 1974
Calocalanus kristalli Shmeleva, 1968
Calocalanus latus Shmeleva, 1968
Calocalanus lomonosovi Shmeleva, 1975
Calocalanus longifurca Shmeleva, 1975
Calocalanus longisetosus Shmeleva, 1965
Calocalanus longispinus Shmeleva, 1978
Calocalanus minor Shmeleva, 1980
Calocalanus minutus Andronov, 1973
Calocalanus monospinus Chen & Shen, 1974
Calocalanus namibiensis Andronov, 1973
Calocalanus nanus Shmeleva, 1987
Calocalanus neptunus Shmeleva, 1965
Calocalanus omaniensis Shmeleva, 1975
Calocalanus ovalis Shmeleva, 1965
Calocalanus paracontractus Shmeleva, 1974
Calocalanus parelongatus Shmeleva, 1979
Calocalanus pavo (Dana, 1852)
Calocalanus pavoninus Farran, 1936
Calocalanus plumatus Shmeleva, 1965
Calocalanus plumulosus (Claus, 1863)
Calocalanus pseudocontractus Bernard, 1958
Calocalanus pubes Andronov, 1973
Calocalanus pyriformis Shmeleva, 1975
Calocalanus regini Shmeleva, 1987
Calocalanus sayademalja Shmeleva, 1987
Calocalanus spinosus Shmeleva, 1987
Calocalanus styliremis Giesbrecht, 1888
Calocalanus tenuiculus Andronov, 1973
Calocalanus vinogradovi Shmeleva, 1987
Calocalanus vitjazi Shmeleva, 1974
Calocalanus vivesei Shmeleva, 1979

References

Calanoida